Mazraat Bani Saab (also spelled Mazraat Abi Saab or Mazraat Beni’ Saab) (Arabic: مزرعة بني صعب) is a village in the Bsharri District of Lebanon. The village is located near the towns of Qnat and Mazraat Aassaf. The village is designated by the Ministry of Tourism as a protected ecotourism site.

Population 
Mazraat Bani Saab has a registered population of 230, with 40 people residing there in winter and 120 in summer. The town has approximately 300 emigrants, and some residents migrate to Australia. The population has stayed relatively low, with little population growth since the 70s.

Geography 
Mazraat Bani Saab is located in an elevated part of Lebanon, near the Kadisha Valley. There is a large cliff to the west of the town that has with a spring called Aïn Karm el Hiddâd.

Industry 
The economy is Mazraat Bani Saab is rapidly declining and according to the residents. Employment is poor in Mazraat Bani Saab, with half of the village unemployed. The other half makes an average of $13-20 dollars per day. Female employment is low, with only 2 females employed in the entire village. The major product in the village is agricultural products, specifically fruit trees. The infrastructure is also poor, with no running water available in the village.

References 

Populated places in the North Governorate
Bsharri District